Kalittokai ( meaning the kali-metre anthology) is a classical Tamil poetic work and the sixth of Eight Anthologies (Ettuthokai) in the Sangam literature. It is an "akam genre – love and erotic – collection par excellence", according to Kamil Zvelebil – a Tamil literature and history scholar. The anthology contains 150 poems and was compiled by one of the authors named Nallantuvanar. The collection has a different tone, metre and style than earlier Sangam literature, evidence that it is a late Sangam work, likely from the 3rd-century CE or after. Naccinarkiniyar, a Tamil scholar who lived during the 14th-century CE, has commented on this work.

It is unclear whether the Kalittokai was authored by more than one author. Some scholars attribute the collection to five authors, including one by the famed Sangam poet Kapilar. Others, such as S.V. Damodaram Pillai and K.N. Sivaraja Pillai consider it the work of one poet.

The Kalittokai anthology uses the kali metre of varied length. This metre is more advanced and complex than the akaval metre found in earlier Sangam poetry. The kali metre combines aciriyam and venpa, creating opportunities to set dialogues within the metre. The poets who composed the Kalittokai created what comes across as a "one-act plays", sometimes with "coarse, spicy, racy, rude, bawdy, or humorous" dialogues, states Zvelebil. According to Herman Tieken, these compositions are examples of lasya minor dance scenes as described in the chapters 19 and 31 of the Natyasastra. The kali metre has several structural subtypes, each suited for different literary purposes.

The poems include cultured love situations, as well as erotics, folkmotifs and vulgar situations. Its poems are categorised into the five tinais according to the mood and subject matter conforming to the Sangam landscape. The first part (2-36) deals with paalai setting, the second (37-65) with kurinchi, the third (66-100) with marutam, the fourth (101-117) with mullai and the fifth (118-150) with neital. These five section were each written by a separate author. Perunkadunkon wrote the paalai songs, the poet Kapilar is attributed to the kurinchi, Ilanaagan the marutham songs, Nalluruthiran the mullai songs and the poet nallanthuvan the neithal songs.

The Kalittokai poems are notable for the relatively higher number of Sanskrit loan words, lexical and structural innovations, the practice of quoting lines of earlier poems such as Kuṟuntokai 18.5, and the lack the names of chieftains, kings or poets. The anthology is also notable for including allusions and references to pan-Indian love and moral legends found in Epics– and Puranas–genre Sanskrit texts. According to Zvelebil, some examples in the Kalittokai include Duryodhana's evil plans to kill the Pandava brothers in poem 25, the battle of Murugan and Surapadma in poem 27, Ravana of Ramayana epic in poem 38, Bhima in poem 52, Krishna killing Kansa in poems 52 and 134, Shiva's legends in poems 101 and 150, the love story of Urvasi and Tilottama in poem 109, among others.

The poems of Kalithogai show evidence of the ancient music of the Tamil people with its rhythmic phrases.

Examples

References

Bibliography

 Mudaliyar, Singaravelu A., Apithana Cintamani, An encyclopaedia of Tamil Literature, (1931) - Reprinted by Asian Educational Services, New Delhi (1983)
 
 
 Selby, Martha Ann (2011) Tamil Love Poetry: The Five Hundred Short Poems of the Aiṅkuṟunūṟu, an Early Third-Century Anthology. Columbia University Press, 

 
 

Sangam literature

ta:தமிழ் இலக்கியம்